Le dilettante d'Avignon (English: The Dilettante of Avignon) is an 1829 opéra comique in one act by Fromental Halévy, to a libretto by his brother Léon Halévy, based on an uncompleted work by François-Benoit Hoffmann. It was the composer's first popular success, since it was his first venture into opera after the relative failure in the previous year of Clari.

Composition history
Léon Halévy was offered the uncompleted libretto of Le dilettante by Hoffmann's son. He developed it into a witty satire on Italian music, and the work was premiered at the Opéra-Comique on 7 November 1829. The libretto contains some sly fun about the composer; like the imposter 'Imbroglio', Fromental Halévy himself was a graduate of the Prix de Rome, and was at the time of the premiere a 'chef du chant' (singing director), in this case at the Paris Opéra.

It was well received by the critics, becoming the composer's first popular success, running for 119 performances. Moreover, the publisher Maurice Schlesinger was impressed by it, published the score and took Halévy into his stable.

Roles

Synopsis
Place: The foyer of a theatre in Avignon
Time:

The charlatan director 'Casanova' (in fact a Frenchman) claims to  love only Italian music. In fact he is musically illiterate and cannot speak Italian. Having sacked his French musicians he calls for an audition by some 'Italian' singers (who are the same French singers in disguise). The singing director at the theatre, also posing as an Italian, is enamoured with the daughter of 'Casanova'. Eventually all is revealed, and everyone agrees that the best thing would be to use the best points of both the French and Italian traditions.

Recordings
Le dilettante d’Avignon  Michel Piquemal 2CD 2019

References
Notes

Sources
 Halevy, Léon,  Le dilettante d'Avignon, opéra comique en un acte, Paris, 1829. On Google Play 
 Halévy, Léon, F. Halévy: sa vie et ses oeuvres, Paris: Heugel et cie, 1863.
 Jordan, Ruth, Fromental Halévy: His Life and Music.  London: Kahn and Averill, 1994. 

Operas
1829 operas
Operas by Fromental Halévy
Opéras comiques
Operas set in France
French-language operas
Opera world premieres at the Opéra-Comique